The Knabb-Bieber Mill is located in Oley Township, Pennsylvania. The mill was built in 1809 and was added to the National Register of Historic Places on November 8, 1990.

This grist mill was built in 1809 for John Knabb and was acquired around 1875 by John Bieber by his marriage to Maggie Knabb. Their fourth son, Effinger Bieber, inherited the property. He married Mary Moyer. They ran the mill until his death in 1996. Mary continued to run the mill until her death in early 1998. Like Effinger, she was in her 90s when she died. 
Up until the time of her death the mill was producing commercially and continuously since its construction, for nearly 190 years.

The mill equipment is powered by water from the Monocacy Creek. The mill sits on a property of approximately 25 acres on Bieber Mill Road in the Oley Valley of Pennsylvania.

See also
National Register of Historic Places listings in Berks County, Pennsylvania

References

External links
 Knabb-Bieber Mill, Monocacy Creek (Oley Township), Oley, Berks County, PA: 5 photos and 3 data pages, at Historic American Buildings Survey

Historic American Buildings Survey in Pennsylvania
Grinding mills in Berks County, Pennsylvania
Grinding mills on the National Register of Historic Places in Pennsylvania
Industrial buildings completed in 1809
National Register of Historic Places in Berks County, Pennsylvania
1809 establishments in Pennsylvania